Uzbekistan competed in the 2008 Summer Olympics held in Beijing, People's Republic of China from August 8 to August 24, 2008, with a team of 58 athletes.

Medalists

Athletics

Men
Track & road events

Field events

Combined events – Decathlon

Women
Track & road events

Field events

Combined events – Heptathlon

* The athlete who finished in second place, Lyudmila Blonska of Ukraine, tested positive for a banned substance. Both the A and the B tests were positive, therefore Blonska was stripped of her silver medal, and Tarasova moved up a position.

Boxing

Uzbekistan qualified seven boxers for the Olympic boxing tournament. Atoev was the first to qualify, earning a spot in the light heavyweight class at the 2007 World Championships. Four more boxers (both Sultonovs, Mahmudov, and Rasulov) qualified at the first Asian qualifying tournament. Doniyorov and Tadjibayev both qualified at the second qualifier.

Canoeing

Sprint

Qualification Legend: QS = Qualify to semi-final; QF = Qualify directly to final

Cycling

Road

Gymnastics

Artistic
Men

Women

Trampoline

Judo

Men

Women

Rowing

Men

Qualification Legend: FA=Final A (medal); FB=Final B (non-medal); FC=Final C (non-medal); FD=Final D (non-medal); FE=Final E (non-medal); FF=Final F (non-medal); SA/B=Semifinals A/B; SC/D=Semifinals C/D; SE/F=Semifinals E/F; QF=Quarterfinals; R=Repechage

Shooting

Men

Women

Swimming

Men

Women

Qualifiers for the latter rounds (Q) of all events were decided on a time only basis, therefore positions shown are overall results versus competitors in all heats.

Taekwondo

Tennis

Weightlifting

Wrestling

Men's freestyle

Men's Greco-Roman

References

Official 2008 Summer Olympics Results Website

Nations at the 2008 Summer Olympics
2008
Summer Olympics